Temple Sinai is an historic Reform synagogue at 11620 Warwick Boulevard in Newport News, Virginia.  Established in 1955, the congregation was the first (and to date is the only) Reform congregation on the Virginia Peninsula.  Its building was designed by Edward Loewenstein and completed in 1960, and is a locally significant example of Modern architecture.  It is a roughly rectangular single-story building, finished in brick veneer, with a projecting trapezoidal entrance.  The building was listed on the National Register of Historic Places in 2015.

See also
 National Register of Historic Places in Newport News, Virginia

References

External links
Temple Sinai website

Buildings and structures in Newport News, Virginia
Reform synagogues in Virginia
National Register of Historic Places in Newport News, Virginia
Synagogues on the National Register of Historic Places in Virginia
Religious organizations established in 1895
1895 establishments in Virginia
Synagogues completed in 1912
1912 establishments in Virginia
Synagogues completed in 1960
1960 establishments in Virginia
Modernist architecture in Virginia
Modernist synagogues